Myanmar Extended-A is a Unicode block containing Myanmar characters for writing the Khamti Shan and Aiton languages.

Block

The block has eleven variation sequences defined for standardized variants.  They use  (VS01) to denote the dotted letters used for the Khamti, Aiton, and Phake languages.  (Note that this is font dependent.  For example, the Padauk font supports some of the dotted forms.)

History
The following Unicode-related documents record the purpose and process of defining specific characters in the Myanmar Extended-A block:

References 

Unicode blocks